The Ministry of Science, Technology and Environment (MoSTE) was a Thai government ministry from 1992 until 2002. With the coming into effect of the Restructuring of Government Agencies Act of 2002, the ministry was reorganized into the following separate ministries:

 Ministry of Science and Technology
 Ministry of Energy
 Ministry of Natural Resources and Environment

See also
 List of government ministries of Thailand

References

Science, Technology and Environment
2002 disestablishments in Southeast Asia
Thailand
Environmental agencies in Thailand
1992 establishments in Thailand